Jeffery Wood (born December 22, 1986) is an American actor. He is best known for his role as Austin Warren during the first two seasons of the 1990s sitcom, In the House, and Jimmy Harrison on Sunset Beach.

In 2017, Jeff starred alongside Nathan Fillion as the 'Warlock' in the live-action trailer for the Bungie and Activision video game, Destiny 2.

Acting career
Wood made his on-screen debut in commercials and guest starring television roles. In 1994, he landed a role in the 5 Tony Award winning Vivian Beaumont Theater revival of Carousel. After a year with the production, he landed his first major television role as Austin Warren in the then-NBC sitcom In the House. He has also made appearances on several series, including New York Undercover, The Parent 'Hood, Strong Medicine and had a contract role as Jimmy Harrison on NBC's soap opera Sunset Beach from 1997-1999.

Filmography

Film

Television

Theater

Music career
In his early to mid teens, Wood made a transition into hip hop under the name J-Dub. After the release of his popular 2012 mixtape The Captain, he released his final album, Insomnia, in 2013.

Business ventures
In 2011, Wood created and ran RapRise.com, a blog site for unsigned hip hop.

In 2013, Wood created the film production company Puzzle Man.

References

External links

J-Dub Official Website

1986 births
Living people
Male actors from New York City
African-American musicians
American male child actors
American male film actors
Record producers from New York (state)
American male soap opera actors
American male stage actors
Hip hop record producers
People from Manhattan
21st-century African-American people
20th-century African-American people